Jack Heaton (1912–1998) was a rugby union international who represented England from 1935 to 1947. He also captained his country.

Early life
Jack Heaton was born on 30 August 1912.

Rugby union career
Heaton made his international debut on 19 January 1935 at Twickenham in the England vs Wales match.
Of the 9 matches he played for his national side he was on the winning side on 5 occasions.
He played his final match for England on 19 April 1947 at Twickenham in the England vs France match.

References

1912 births
1998 deaths
English rugby union players
England international rugby union players
Rugby union centres
Waterloo R.F.C. players
Lancashire County RFU players